Hyperteleatum or Hyperteleaton was a place in ancient Laconia, in the territory of Asopus, at the distance of 50 stadia from the latter town, containing a temple of Asclepius.

Its site is located near the modern .

References

Populated places in ancient Laconia
Former populated places in Greece